is a Prefectural Natural Park in central Nara Prefecture, Japan. Established in 1972, the park spans the borders of the municipalities of Yoshino, Shimoichi, Ōyodo, and Gojō. The park extends along the Yoshino River, encompasses lake Tsuboro, and borders an area of the Yoshino-Kumano National Park.

See also
 National Parks of Japan
 Yoshino-Kumano National Park

References

External links
  Map of the parks of Nara Prefecture

Parks and gardens in Nara Prefecture
Protected areas established in 1972
1972 establishments in Japan